Whakakī lagoon is a small coastal lagoon found on the east coast of New Zealand's North Island and is a part of the Hawke's Bay region. The shoreline and sediment bed are mainly composed of sapric soil from nearby farming runoff and lithic sand from the sand bank of the neighboring Whakakī beach.

Geography
Whakaki lagoon is located between state highway 2 and Whakaki beach,
Because of this both Whakaki lagoon and Whakaki beach are known fishing areas.
Whakaki has no or very small outlet to the ocean during high rainfalls the lagoon needs to be manually let out. 
Mountains in the nearby area hold folklore of seven whales being turned to stone and thus mountains when not returning home- Hikunui, Iwitea, Korito, Takitaki, Onepoto, Tahutoria and Tuhara

Biota

Flora
Noninvasive Flora
Gorse (Ulex europaeus)
Sweet briar (Rosa rubiginosa)
Boxthorn (Lycium ferocissimum)
Marram grass (Amophilla arnearia)
Pampas grass (Cortaderia selloana)
Lupin (Lupinus arboreus)
Iceplant (Carpobrotus edulis)
Invasive flora
Blackberry (Rubus fruticous)
Boneseed (Chrysanthemoides monilifera)

Fauna

Aquatic fauna
Shortfin eel (Anguilla australis)
Inanga (Galaxias species)
Goldfish/Carp (Carassius auratus)
Common bully (Gobiomorphus cotidianus)
Amphibian fauna
Goose species (of family Anatidae)
Duck species (of family Anatidae)
Common shelduck (of family Anatidae)
Terrestrial fauna
Common rabbit (Oryctolagus cuniculus)

References 

Lagoons of New Zealand
North Island